Mathias Lindström (born 14 January 1981) is a retired Finnish footballer, who played as a central defender. He has played for FC Inter Turku, AC Allianssi, Fredrikstad FK, Tampere United and HJK Helsinki. Lindström last represented FC Inter Turku.

In his career, he has played 224 games and has scored 16 goals. He is the player with most Veikkausliiga titles, currently 7. Lindström won the Veikkausliiga with Tampere United in 2006 and 2007 and with HJK Helsinki 2009, 2010, 2011 and 2012. He also won the Finnish League Cup with AC Allianssi in 2005 and with Tampere United in 2009. He won the Finnish Cup with Tampere United in 2007 and with HJK Helsinki in 2011.

Mathias graduated with a bachelor's degree in economics from Åbo Akademi University in Turku. He is currently studying Journalism (Bachelor's degree) at the Swedish School of Social Science at the University of Helsinki.

Honours

Club
 AC Allianssi
Winner
Finnish League Cup: 2005

 Tampere United
Winner
Veikkausliiga: 2006, 2007
Finnish Cup: 2007
Finnish League Cup: 2009

 HJK Helsinki
Winner
Veikkausliiga: 2009, 2010, 2011, 2012, 2013
Finnish Cup: 2010 (Runner Up), 2011

Individual
Best player of the Year 2002 in Finland U-21
Best defenseman of Veikkausliiga 2011
Voted in Veikkausliiga All-Star team (Pallokopla): 2007, 2011, 2012

References
Guardian Football
Mathias Lindström päättää uransa cupfinaaliin

1981 births
Living people
Finnish footballers
Finnish expatriate footballers
Association football central defenders
Finland B international footballers
Veikkausliiga players
Eliteserien players
Tampere United players
Fredrikstad FK players
Expatriate footballers in Norway
Finland youth international footballers
Finland under-21 international footballers